The Ancient Art of War at Sea is a computer game developed by Broderbund and released for Macintosh and DOS in 1987 as a sequel to The Ancient Art of War.

Plot
The player commands a fleet of ships in this naval-combat simulation which takes place in the late 18th century.

Controllable ship types include the 44-gun frigate with 250 crew, 74-gun (including 10 carronades) ship-of-the-line with over 600 crew, and the 130-gun (including 22 carronades) flagship with 875 crew.

The player faces one of six opponents, each of which employs a different strategy against the player. Five are historic: the Duke of Medina Sidonia (1588); Martin [sic] Tromp (1639); Blackbeard (1718); John Paul Jones (1779); Horatio Nelson (1805); and a fictitious opponent Thor Foote.

Reception

Computer Gaming World in 1987 stated that The Ancient Art of War at Sea "offers a powerful editing system and an enjoyable, playable game" that was superior to its predecessor, with excellent documentation. In 1990 the magazine gave the game three out of five stars, warning that gameplay favored single ships as opposed to fleet actions when fighting enemy fleets. In 1992 the magazine gave the game two stars, stating that it "plays wells as a game, but not as a serious study" and regretting that it was the only Age of Sail game for DOS. Compute! in 1988 also praised the documentation and editor. The game was reviewed in 1988 in Dragon by Hartley, Patricia, and Kirk Lesser in their "The Role of Computers" column. They agreed that War at Sea was better than its predecessor and called it a "must have", giving the game five out of five stars. They particularly enjoyed the ship-to-ship combat.

The game sold more than 100,000 copies.

References

External links

The Ancient Art of War at Sea at IGN
The Ancient Art of War at Sea at GameSpy
Review in PC World
Review in Family Computing

1987 video games
Apple II games
Broderbund games
Classic Mac OS games
DOS games
Evryware games
Naval video games
NEC PC-9801 games
Real-time strategy video games
Single-player video games
Video games developed in the United States